Champa Battambang (ចំប៉ាបាត់ដំបង, which means "The Frangipani of Battambang”) is a popular song of the 1960s composed by Sinn Sisamouth, which has become part of Cambodian heritage.

Translation 
The title which literally translates as the frangipani of Battambang referring to a flower commonly seen in this city of Cambodia. However, in the Khmer language of courtship, it would be more properly understood symbolically as "Oh! Beautiful girl of Battambang".

History

The standard of Cambodian rock 
In 1965, Sin Sisamouth's song Champa Battambang was the first content played on Khmer Republic Television as part of his Album Chlangden Vol. 125. By the 1970s, it had become part of the repertoire of the upcoming scene of Cambodian rock music. It rapidly become a classic, as Khmer rouge Khieu Samphan remembers his Communist friend Hou Yuon singing it with a certain nostalgia before his death in 1975.

In the camps 
For the Khmer musicians who managed to escape the ruthless persecution of the Khmers Rouges who forbade any foreign influence and almost every form of music apart from propaganda, the refugee camps in Thailand were a safe haven were listening to Champa Battambang or the Khmer version of The House of the Rising Sun and others pieces of Cambodian rock music was a certain consolation in their desolation: "Khaodang was a dream encoded in music."

Uniting generations 
In 2012, Champa Battambang was still "one favourite amongst new musical students" in Phnom Penh.

Champa Battambang has become a Cambodian classic united generations. It is the link that connects three generations in the 2018 Khmer drama In the Life of Music. The track was covered by Sin Setsochhata, the granddaughter of the "legendary Sin Sisamouth, perhaps Cambodia’s most celebrated singer from its pre-war period of cultural renaissance."

Lyrics

References 

1960s songs
Cambodian songs
Rock songs